Matías José Ruiz Sosa (born 17 March 1992) is an Argentine professional footballer who plays as a midfielder for Comunicaciones.

Career
Ruiz Sosa began playing professionally for Primera B Metropolitana side Almagro in August 2013, with the midfielder making his debut for the club on 14 August during a win away to Comunicaciones; he made twelve further appearances in his first campaign. He netted the opening goals of his career in the 2015 season, with his first arriving against Deportivo Armenio on 8 June; in a year that sealed promotion to Primera B Nacional. His spell with the club lasted a total of five years, with Ruiz Sosa leaving at the conclusion for 2017–18 to join fellow second tier team Brown.

Career statistics
.

References

External links

1992 births
Living people
Place of birth missing (living people)
Argentine footballers
Association football midfielders
Primera B Metropolitana players
Primera Nacional players
Club Almagro players
Club Atlético Brown footballers
Club Comunicaciones footballers